Martin Ethbert "Cotton" Klindworth (September 28, 1900 – September, 1978) was a baseball player and freshman football coach. He attended Mississippi A&M and played in the Cotton States League. He played two years for the Meridian Mets.

References

Mississippi State Bulldogs baseball players
Baseball catchers